Chersodromia parallela is a species of hybotid dance flies in the family Hybotidae.

References

Hybotidae
Articles created by Qbugbot
Insects described in 1927